The Wildland Firefighters National Monument is an American monument and memorial dedicated to wildland and wildfire firefighters. The monument, which is located on one acre of land, stands on the grounds of the National Interagency Fire Center's (NIFC) headquarters in Boise, Idaho. The monument was dedicated on May 25, 2000.

History
In 1994, fourteen firefighters were killed fighting the South Canyon Fire in Colorado. The Wildland Firefighter Foundation, an organization which assists fallen firefighters and their families, began to seek a way to honor the fourteen firefighters and others who had died in the line of duty, leading to the idea for the present monument.

Memorial
The site of the monument and its surrounding park was originally a parking lot.

Three eight-foot tall, bronze statues of firefighters, which were designed and created by American sculptor Lawrence Nowlan, are the centerpiece of the monument. A waterfall feature was designed by Bill Mitchell and Hugh Carson, both Fire Center employees. Mr. Carson, a former stone mason, spent two summers building the water feature, with daily assistance from the Boise Smokejumpers, who mixed cement and placed rocks in place that they had gathered from a local quarry. Ted Rex used a large front-end loader to gather several larger rocks, one weighing four tons which required the largest crane in Boise to place.

The monument and sculptures are surrounded by one acre of land. A walkway, with commemorative granite stones inscribed with the names of donors and other supporters, brings visitors through the park leads to the memorial. The surrounding area has been landscaped using native trees, wildflowers, shrubs and grass which are native to Idaho.

A replica of one of Lawrence Nowlan's firefighter sculptures was installed in Prescott, Arizona, in August 2013, to commemorate the lives of nineteen firefighters killed in the Yarnell Hill Fire of June 2013.

See also
 List of firefighting monuments and memorials

References

Bronze sculptures in the United States
Buildings and structures completed in 2000
Buildings and structures in Boise, Idaho
Firefighting in the United States
Firefighting memorials
Monuments and memorials in Idaho
Outdoor sculptures in the United States
Sculptures in Idaho
Sculptures of men in the United States
Tourist attractions in Boise, Idaho
2000 establishments in Idaho